Ottawa Hills High School is a public high school in the village of Ottawa Hills, Ohio, United States, just west of Toledo.  It is the only high school in the Ottawa Hills Local Schools district.  The school's mascot is the Green Bears.

Appearance
The high school is attached to Ottawa Hills Junior High, and as a whole the building is commonly referred to as Ottawa Hills Junior/Senior High School or OHJHS by the villagers. Just outside is a flagpole built by Alumni of OHHS.  The Liberty Memorial was added to the area around the flagpole with donations from community members and alumni.  The Liberty Memorial was designed by Ottawa Hills resident and architect Todd Kime.

Students
The school frequently consists of between 300 and 400 high school students.  Known for academics, students at Ottawa Hills excel with a college preparatory curriculum.  In 2015, Newsweek ranked Ottawa Hills High School number #1 in Ohio and #45 in the nation.

Athletics
The Green Bears have won multiple state titles.  Most recently, the boys' golf team won the 2013 Division III State Championship.  Boys' basketball made it to the state final four for the first time in school history in March 2010, losing to Newark Catholic 48–36 in the state semifinals. In 2008 the Boys' soccer team defeated Worthington Christian 1–0, becoming the first school from Northwest Ohio to win a state soccer title.
The football team is tied for the most consecutive victories by a Northwest Ohio team with a 23-game winning streak from 1972 to 1974 (two undefeated seasons). Coach Norm Niedermeier was the football head coach for 40 years from 1957 to 1996, with 4 undefeated teams.
The boys' tennis team qualified for states for the first time in school history in 2016. The Green Bears defeated Lexington High School 3-0 after having a 9-year losing streak to them in the Regional Finals.
The women's dance team received second in state for POM division and fourth in state in Jazz division in 2017.
In the year of 2018 the soccer and lacrosse team were state runners-up. The baseball team and tennis team also went to the regional finals. The football team won their conference.
The tennis team advanced to the state finals in 2019.

Notable alumni
Christine Brennan—sports columnist, TV and radio commentator, best-selling author and nationally known speaker is especially known for her coverage of the Olympics
John Colenback–actor best known for portraying Dan Stewart on As the World Turns
Evan G. Galbraith—United States Ambassador to France from 1981 to 1985 under Ronald Reagan and the Secretary of Defense Representative to Europe and NATO under Donald Rumsfeld from 2002 to 2007
Steve Gordon (class of 1957)—screenwriter and director of the 1981 Academy Award-winning film, Arthur
Constance Hauman (class of 1979)—singer-songwriter and actress. She is credited with having the only live recording of Alban Berg's Lulu in the title role, recorded in Copenhagen 1996 at the Queen of Denmark's Castle. Constance Hauman's first full-length release of original songs, Falling Into Now, was chosen by the Guardian UK Music Critic Caroline Sullivan as one of the top 10 best pop albums of 2015.
Carl Eugene Heiles (class of 1957)—astrophysicist noted for his contribution to the understanding of diffuse interstellar matter through observational radio astronomy
Jamie O'Hara—country singer/songwriter who wrote the number one Grammy-winning country song of the year "Grandpa (Tell Me 'Bout the Good Ol' Days)" in 1986, performed by the group the Judds
Tom Scholz—rock musician, songwriter, inventor, engineer, and philanthropist, best known as the founder of the band Boston. He is also the inventor of the Rockman portable guitar amplifier. He has been described by Allmusic as "a notoriously 'un-rock n' roll' figure who never enjoyed the limelight of being a performer," preferring to concentrate almost exclusively on his music, and in more recent years, spending much of his time working with charities. Lead guitarist of the band Boston.
Mark D. Wagoner, Jr. (class of 1990)—politician and former Republican member of the Ohio Senate and Ohio House of Representatives

References

External links
 District Website

High schools in Lucas County, Ohio
Public high schools in Ohio